Concordia is a ghost town in Bolivar County, Mississippi, United States, located on the eastern edge of the Mississippi Levee, approximately  west of Mississippi Highway 1.

Once an important Mississippi River shipping port for cotton, little remains of the community but a cemetery.

History
Concordia is one of the oldest communities in Bolivar County.  The Concordia Cemetery, located south of the community, has been used since 1848, and is marked with a historic plaque.  The Concordia Methodist Church was also located there.

Concordia was officially formed in 1866, and included "Carson's Landing", located north of the settlement.

Concordia had a population of about 250 by 1879, when yellow fever struck, killing half the population.  The town was quarantined for a period.

The town became further isolated sometime prior to 1939, when the Mississippi River changed its course. The river had previously followed the "Concordia Bend", with the town located on the east bank.

The area west of Concordia, between the levee and the Mississippi River, is used by the Concordia Hunting Club, and occupies .

References

Former populated places in Bolivar County, Mississippi
Former populated places in Mississippi
Mississippi populated places on the Mississippi River